The Port Hills are a range of hills in Canterbury Region, so named because they lie between the city of Christchurch and its port at Lyttelton. They are an eroded remnant of the Lyttelton volcano, which erupted millions of years ago.

The hills start at Godley Head, run approximately east–west along the northern side of Lyttelton Harbour, and continue running to the south, dividing the city from the harbour. The range terminates near Gebbies Pass above the head of the harbour. The range includes a number of summits between 300 and 500 metres above sea level. The range is of significant geological, environmental and scenic importance.

History

The volcano is one of two from which Banks Peninsula was originally formed 12 million years ago. The area was first populated by Māori during the 14th century. During early European settlement some 500 years later the Port Hills presented a challenging barrier between the harbour and the planned settlement of Christchurch, their steepness and ruggedness making access extremely difficult. For many years the majority of settlers used the precipitous Bridle Path to transport themselves and their belongings to the plains on the other side. Today the Lyttelton road tunnel and a separate rail tunnel connect the port and the city suburbs, and three road routes crossing the range – via Evans, Dyers and Gebbies passes – are connected by the Summit Road.

In February 2017, bush fires in the Port Hills burned for days, destroying over 2000 Ha of bush and several homes.

Geography and conservation

The Port Hills are a prominent feature of the central Canterbury landscape, being visible for many kilometres from the north and west.

The crest of the Port Hills varies somewhat in height, being lowest at the eastern (seaward) end. Two road passes traverse the Port Hills from Christchurch.  Dyers Pass (elevation c. 330 m), almost due south of central Christchurch is the more prominent of the two passes. Evans Pass (elevation c. 200 m), which is near the eastern end of the Port Hills, normally connects Sumner and Lyttelton but was closed since the 2011 Christchurch earthquake caused significant damage to Sumner Road on the Lyttelton side of the pass until reopening in 2019.

Between Evans Pass and Dyers Pass are several significant summits, including Sugarloaf (494 m), recognisable by the television transmission tower on its summit; Mount Cavendish (448 m); and Tauhinukorokio / Mount Pleasant (499 m), the highest peak in the northern arc of the Port Hills. West of Dyers Pass, the Port Hills curve away southward and become even higher, rising to 573 m at Coopers Knob. From Coopers Knob the crater rim descends to Gebbies Pass (elevation c. 160 m). The hills south and east of Gebbies Pass are regarded as part of Banks Peninsula proper rather than the Port Hills.

Several suburbs of Christchurch extend onto the northern slopes of the Port Hills, including Cashmere, Mt Pleasant, Heathcote Valley and Sumner. Other parts of the hills are used for farming and forestry, as well as a significant number of scenic reserves created for recreational and conservation purposes, following an initiative by Christchurch councillor Harry Ell at the turn of the 20th century. In 1948 the Summit Road Scenic Society was formed to continue development and maintenance of the reserves.

The hills are an important recreation area for Christchurch residents, with several public parks and reserves, including tracks for mountain biking and walking. A gondola lift to the top of Mount Cavendish was opened in 1992, providing convenient access to the summit and a major tourist attraction for the Canterbury area. The Christchurch Adventure Park was opened in 2016 which provides mountain biking opportunities on the slopes of Worsleys Hill. Road cycling is also very popular on the Port Hills with "short bays" and "long bays" being two of the most popular longer routes.

Demographics

Port Hills had a population of 72 at the 2018 New Zealand census, a decrease of 18 people (-20.0%) since the 2013 census, and a decrease of 12 people (-14.3%) since the 2006 census. There were 30 households. There were 39 males and 33 females, giving a sex ratio of 1.18 males per female. The median age was 47.5 years (compared with 37.4 years nationally), with 15 people (20.8%) aged under 15 years, 9 (12.5%) aged 15 to 29, 45 (62.5%) aged 30 to 64, and 6 (8.3%) aged 65 or older.

Ethnicities were 95.8% European/Pākehā, 8.3% Asian, and 4.2% other ethnicities (totals add to more than 100% since people could identify with multiple ethnicities).

The proportion of people born overseas was 20.8%, compared with 27.1% nationally.

Although some people objected to giving their religion, 58.3% had no religion, 20.8% were Christian, 4.2% were Hindu, 4.2% were Buddhist and 8.3% had other religions.

Of those at least 15 years old, 24 (42.1%) people had a bachelor or higher degree, and 3 (5.3%) people had no formal qualifications. The median income was $50,300, compared with $31,800 nationally. The employment status of those at least 15 was that 30 (52.6%) people were employed full-time, 9 (15.8%) were part-time, and 3 (5.3%) were unemployed.

Flora and fauna
Despite the heavy deforestation and clearance of native bush that took place during early settlement, a diverse range of wildlife and plant life populates the Port Hills. Native birds such as the bellbird (korimako or koparara) fantail, silvereye, grey warbler and shining cuckoo are commonly found in the remaining bush. While the wood pigeon often seen in the area is a native to New Zealand others, such as the common blackbird, common chaffinch and song thrush are introduced and very populous species. As well as a great many insect species, gecko and skink are commonly found.

Indigenous plant species such as Banks Peninsula hebe inhabit rock crevices along with rare ferns. The more exposed hillsides are covered with silver tussock and other native grasses, unusually so for an area so close to urban development.

The remaining podocarp forest contains 500- to 600-year-old mataī, tōtara and kahikatea trees as well as fruit and flowering species such as kōwhai, ribbonwood, māhoe, cabbage trees, kānuka and fuchsia.

References

Further reading

External links
Port Hills at the Christchurch City Council
 Christchurch Gondola
 Photo album showing earthquake damage in Port Hills suburbs

Mountain biking in New Zealand
Mountain ranges of Canterbury, New Zealand
Geography of Christchurch